The gargoyle cusk (Xyelacyba myersi) is a species of cusk-eel from the subfamily Neobythitinae of the family Ophidiidae.  This species grows to a length of  TL.  It is the only known member of its genus. The specific name honours George S. Myers (1905-1985) of Stanford University who taught the describer, Daniel Cohen, ichthyology.  It is a rare benthopelagic fish which occurs at depths of  around the world, other than the eastern Pacific, in tropical and subtropical latitudes.

References

Ophidiidae
Monotypic fish genera
Fish described in 1961